Mary Lisa Marrero Vázquez (born January 16, 1974) better known by her stage name Lisa M, is a Puerto Rican rapper, singer, composer, dancer and record producer. She is known as the first female rapper artist to debut in Latin America.

Early life 
Mary Lisa Marrero Vázquez was born on January 17, 1974, from Dominican parents in Puerta de Tierra, a neighborhood of San Juan, Puerto Rico she started, hip-hop dancing at the age of 11 years old, going on to work later as a dancer for reggaeton artist Vico C.

Career

Trampa and No Lo Derrumbes 
Lisa M recorded her first album Trampa in 1989 at the age of 15 with the record label Prime Records. The first songs she recorded in this album "Trampa" was "La Segunda Cita" (with Puerto Rican rapper star and pioneer Vico C) were the starting point to her successful career making her the first female Spanish Rapper in Puerto Rico and Latin America. She grew more and more popular becoming the most successful artist in her genre for her interpretative strength, diversity, skill, and sensuality of her performance. In a short time, she captivated her audience as she throughout her performances in Central, South America, the Caribbean, and the United States. The success of this album achieved its first gold record.

Lisa M recorded her second album in 1990 titled No Lo Derrumbes which obtained Platinum surpassing the 100,000 copies sold in Puerto Rico and the United States with the hits "No Lo Derrumbes", "Tu Pum-Pum" and "Menealo "Ja- Rican Jive feat. Pesos", "Cuerpo Y Alma" "Rico En Amor" "Album produced by Miguel Correa, Jorge Oquendo (Prime Records) Dj Playero, Baron Lopez y Eduardo Reyes All the songs written by Vico C and Lisa M.

Sony Music  
In 1991, Lisa M signed to the multinational record label Sony Music, and launched her third album titled Flavor of the Latin which had overwhelming success in Puerto Rico and throughout Latin America acquiring a Platinum record. She sold out tours in Puerto Rico, Ecuador, Nicaragua, Costa Rica, Guatemala, Peru, Bolivia, Panama, Venezuela, Dominican Republic, El Salvador, Honduras and United States , in which she performed concerts sharing and collaborating with celebrities like Celia Cruz, Juan Gabriel, Gloria Estefan, Ricky Martin, Selena and Tito Puente.

The greatest hits of this album  "Tiempo De Amar", "Everybody Dancing Now",  "Ingrato" and "Flavor of the Latin" won her an award for Best International Artist on "TVyNovelas", and Premio Lo Nuestro. Her next album Ahora Vengo Alborota came out in 1992 adding to Lisa M's platinum status in her career.

Lisa M returns in 1996 with her sixth album titled "Soy Atrevida", which was equally successful, her seventh Album "Y Sobreviví" in 1998. Lisa M working with prestigious artists such as Ricky Martin and India. Her extraordinary success has been awarded gold and platinum for sales in the United States.

In 2001 she continues her success story with the launching of her calendar "Lisa M" 2001. She hosted Internationally known "Jamz" mun2 TV show program on Telemundo which achieved ratings internationally opening the doors for reggaetón and urban music artists in the United States and South America.

Respect 
In 2005 White Lion Records, recognized as one of the best labels of the urban genre at that time, signed Lisa M to her album titled Respect including the songs "Fuego", "Hey Ladies", "Encendio" and collaborating with Tego Calderon in the song "Quitate" which was recorded with the best producers of the urban genre. This album was another success positioning Pioneer Lisa M one more time in the charts as one of the best-selling albums. "Hey, Ladies" was presented as a soundtrack in the movie Feel the Noise produced by Jennifer Lopez (2007) starring Omarion Grandberry, Giancarlo Esposito, and Melanie Diaz. In 2008 SonyBMG launches Respect Delux which is a compilation of hits premixed, and a duet with La India who is well known international salsa star known by her fans as "La Princesa De La Salsa".

Lisa M DJ 
In 2005, Lisa M started exploring another side of her artistic talent as she is well known in the music industry as Rap Artist, Record Producer, and Dancer for more than 25 years now. She pleasantly surprised her fans working as a Professional DJ, known as "DJ Miss M" "Lisa M" again revolutionizing the world of electronic music with her unique style. As the product of years of experience in the music industry, Lisa M launched her career as a DJ in Miami playing after hours marathon sessions.

As a DJ, she has performed at clubs and events being one of the most respected DJs in cities like Miami, Detroit, New York, Las Vegas, LA, Puerto Rico, Dominican Republic, Spain, Greece, Monaco, Morocco, Granada, Sweden and Ibiza mixing a variety of musical styles from House, Techno, Tech House, Tribal Tech and Deep House; strengthening her position and artistry in the world of DJs, Lisa M is the first female Latin artist to become an International Celebrity DJ.

In 2007 and 2008 her agenda was booked as she made appearances in various clubs and also at the Winter Music Conference in Miami. Lisa M continued until 2009  and started Couture Sound, the name for the label in which she recorded sessions, produced and remixed for many artists, compilations, and other labels.

In 2010 Lisa M visited Barcelona, Spain to expand her music, style, position and continue to surprise her fans. She achieved immediate public acceptance, playing in various clubs including the most prestigious and important "Club Pacha" in Barcelona. Later that year she returned to Miami to perform at the WMC (Winter Music Conference) 2010 and participated in important venues like the hotel pool party Shelbourne, Nikki Beach, Discoteka, Nocturnal. When she completed her agenda in Miami, she went back in Europe (Spain) in the summer, signing a contract with one of the most important Event Companies in Europe, Cafe Ole, positioning the artist as one of the most important Celebrity DJs in clubs all over Europe, such as Club Discothèque, Space Ibiza. Lisa M also worked with famous DJs such as David Guetta, Carl Cox, Wally Lopez, David Vendetta, Matt Caseli, Marco Carola, Steve Lawler, Loco Dice, Oscar G,  and many other greats. She also made an appearance at one of the most important live radio shows of Ibiza, Ibiza Global Radio, alongside David Moreno and Tony Moreno, and also worked with DJs Chus and David Penn in the song "Libres Para Siempre"

Lisa M is now one of the most important Female DJs in the Electronic Music scene with a unique style of Super Tech Tribal Techno influenced by the sound and style of her favorite DJs Luciano de Cadenza, Technasia, Loco Dice, Carl Cox and Nicole Moudaber.

As of 2016, after all this time traveling the world as a DJ, Lisa M returns to the recording studios to record what will be her first single titled "La Calle Se Puso Pa Mi" under her own record label VBW inc and Tentandote in 2017. With a good response from the public and thousands of views in social media platforms, she is recording a few more singles. In 2018 she recorded "Malas Palabras" featuring Ñengo Flow, one of the most influential rappers in the urban genre. Before her new album coming out in 2019, Lisa M is preparing to go on tour and give her fans an Epic Show which combines and integrates her as DJ.

Discography

Albums

Charted singles

Other songs

See also

 List of Puerto Ricans

References

1974 births
Living people
Singers from San Juan, Puerto Rico
21st-century Puerto Rican women singers
Puerto Rican reggaeton musicians
Puerto Rican LGBT singers
20th-century Puerto Rican women singers